Season 4 of Austria's Next Topmodel aired on Puls 4 from January to March 2012.

Host Lena Gercke, Elvyra Geyer and Atil Kutoglu all returned as judges. The season premiered on 12 January 2012 and began with 21 semi-finalists, who were joined by Yemisi Rieger, who was chosen by Niki Lauda as a wildcard contestant at a separate casting. Sixteen contestants were chosen to advance to the main competition.

On 22 January 2012, during the airing of the season, a contestant, 21-year-old Sabrina Rauch, was killed in a car accident, three days after the airing of the episode she was eliminated in. The program paid tribute to her at the beginning of the following episode.

The winner of the competition was 16-year-old Antonia Hausmair, who represented Burgenland. As her prizes, she received a contract with Vienna-based modeling agency Wiener Models, a cover of Austrian Woman magazine and a position as the face of Kornmesser jewelry.

Contestants

(ages stated are at start of contest)

Episodes

Episode 1 
Original airdate: 
Challenge winner: Lana Baltic
Eliminated: Isabelle Raisa & Alina Chlebecek

Episode 2 
Original airdate: 
Challenge winner/Booked for job: Antonia Hausmair 
Best photo: Michaela Schopf
Bottom two/eliminated: Sabrina Rauch & Katharina Mihalovic

Episode 3 
Original airdate: 
Booked for job: None
Challenge winner/Best photo: Izabela Pop Kostic
Eliminated: Nataša Maric

Episode 4 
Original airdate: 
Quit: Michaela Schopf
Booked for job: all girls
Challenge winner/best photo: Izabela Pop Kostic
Bottom three: Bianca Ebelsberger, Christine Riener & Lana Baltic
Eliminated: Christine Riener

Episode 5 
Original airdate: 
Challenge winner: Bianca Ebelsberger
Booked for job: Nadine Trinker 
Best photo: Gina Adamu
Bottom two: Lana Baltic & Yemisi Rieger
Eliminated: None

Episode 6 
Original airdate: 
Challenge winner: Antonia Hausmair
Booked for job: Bianca Ebelsberger
Best photo: Gina Adamu
Eliminated: Madalina Andreica
Bottom two: Antonia Hausmair & Bianca Ebelsberger
Eliminated: See below

Episode 7 
Original airdate: 
Eliminated (episode 6): None
Challenge winner: Melisa Popanicic 
Booked for job: Lana Baltic & Melisa Popanicic  
Best photo: Lana Baltic
Eliminated: Yemisi Rieger

Episode 8 
Original airdate: 
Challenge winner: Nadine Trinker 
Booked for job: Antonia Hausmair & Lana Baltic 
 Best photo: Lana Baltic
 Eliminated: Izabela Pop Kostic
 Bottom two: Bianca Ebelsberger & Melisa Popanicic
 Eliminated: None

Episode 9 
Original airdate: 
Challenge winner: Bianca Ebelsberger
Booked for job: Antonia Hausmair & Gina Adamu
 Eliminated: Bianca Ebelsberger
 Bottom two: Melisa Popanicic & Nadine Trinker
 Eliminated: Nadine Trinker

Finale 
Original airdate: 
 Final four: Antonia Hausmair, Gina Adamu, Lana Baltic & Melisa Popanicic
 First eliminated: Lana Baltic
 Final three: Antonia Hausmair, Gina Adamu & Melisa Popanicic
 Second eliminated: Melisa Popanicic
 Final two: Antonia Hausmair & Gina Adamu
 Austria's Next Topmodel: Antonia Hausmair

Summaries

Results table

 The contestant won best photo
 The contestant quit the competition 
 The contestant was immune from elimination
 The contestant was in danger of elimination
 The contestant was eliminated
 The contestant won the competition

Photo shoot guide
Episode 1 photo shoot: B&W beauty shots and body shots
Episode 2 photo shoot: Posing topless with Dior handbags
Episode 3 photo shoot: Roberto Cavalli dresses with fire
Episode 4 photo shoot: Nude shoot with a water hose
Episode 5 photo shoot: Crying beauty shots
Episode 6 photo shoot: Romantic lesbians in pairs
Episode 7 photo shoot: Looking busted AF with Zhu Zhu Pet purses  
Episode 8 photo shoot: Sensual underwear with a male model
Episode 9 photo shoot: Woman magazine covers
Episode 10 photo shoot: Posing with a snake on silk fabric

References

External links
 Official website

Austria's Next Topmodel
2012 Austrian television seasons
German-language television shows
Television shows filmed in Austria
Television shows filmed in Israel
Television shows filmed in Germany
Television shows filmed in New York City